James Digby Wolfe (4 June 19292 May 2012) was a British actor. After a successful career in the UK and Australia, his later career was based in the US.

Early life 
James Digby Wolfe was born to a father who was an international banker and a mother who was a Vogue magazine artist.  His mother named him after a character in Beau Geste. When he was four, his father died after being hit by a golf ball, and he was brought up by his mother in Felixstowe.

Film and television career 
He made his film debut in the 1948 film The Weaker Sex.  He began writing and performing in comedy series in England in the 1950s. Together with Jimmy Wilson he wrote a revue, with music by John Pritchett and Norman Dannatt, for the Irving Theatre. He appeared alongside Ronnie Corbett, Hattie Jacques and Charles Hawtrey, in his own television show Wolfe at the Door before moving to Sydney in 1959, where he made frequent television appearances and was host of the variety shows, Revue '61 and Revue '62.

At that time, his resident comedian was Dave Allen, who later became a household name in the UK and Australia. Wolfe returned to England for a while in the early 1960s and was a writer on the seminal television satirical review That Was the Week That Was. He also taught screenwriting at USC in the MPW (Master of Professional Writing) program.

Career in the US 
In 1964, he moved to the United States, where his television credits included The Monkees, Bewitched, I Dream of Jeannie, and The Munsters, while his film roles included voice parts in The Jungle Book and Father Goose, in which he sang the main theme. His writing credits included Rowan & Martin's Laugh-In (for which he won an Emmy in 1968; comedian John Barbour credits Wolfe with coining the term "laugh-in"), and The Goldie Hawn Special. He also wrote for John Denver, Shirley MacLaine, Cher and Jackie Mason, among others. In 1976 he hosted two episodes of the Australian version of This Is Your Life.

Later life and death 
Until 2002, Wolfe taught dramatic writing at the University of New Mexico, first as a visiting professor, then as the chair of the Robert Hartung Dramatic Writing Program in the Theatre and Dance Department. He was awarded 'Teacher of the Year' at that university in 2001.

Wolfe died in Albuquerque, New Mexico, aged 82, on 3 May 2012, after a short battle with cancer, and was survived by his wife, Patricia Mannion, and his sister, Hilary Hammond-Williams.

Publications 
 Walking on Fire: The Shaping Force of Emotion in Writing Drama by Digby Wolfe and Jim Linnell, published by Southern Illinois University Press.

Filmography 
The Weaker Sex (1948) – Benjie Dacre
The Guinea Pig (1948) – (uncredited)
Adam and Evalyn (1949) – Undetermined Supporting Role (uncredited)
Landfall (1949) – Pinsley (uncredited)
Stage Fright (1950) – Assistant Stage Manager (uncredited)
The Dark Man (1951) – Young Man at Party
Worm's Eye View (1951) – Cpl. Mark Trelawney
Little Big Shot (1952) – Peter Carton
For Better, for Worse (1954) – Grocer's Assistant
Tale of Three Women (1954) – Brightwell (segment "Final Twist' story)
The Big Money (1956) – Harry Mason
The Jungle Book (1967) – Ziggy, The Vulture (voice, uncredited) (final film role)

References

External links 

Wolfe on TV.com
Wolfe on The Complete Index To World Film since 1895
Wolfe on Television Heaven

1929 births
2012 deaths
20th-century English male actors
21st-century English male actors
British male television writers
Deaths from cancer in New Mexico
Emmy Award winners
English emigrants to Australia
English emigrants to the United States
English male film actors
English male television actors
English male voice actors
English television writers
Logie Award winners
University of New Mexico faculty